Eagles Building is a building in Lorain, Ohio. It was listed on the National Register of Historic Places in 1986. The building has a concrete frame, which was the result of a steel shortage due to World War I.

References

Clubhouses on the National Register of Historic Places in Ohio
Neoclassical architecture in Ohio
Cultural infrastructure completed in 1918
Fraternal Order of Eagles buildings
Buildings and structures in Lorain, Ohio
National Register of Historic Places in Lorain County, Ohio